Carter Tate Barron (January 30, 1905 – November 16, 1950) was a college football player and motion picture executive.

College football

Carter Barron was one of a trio of football playing brothers for Bill Alexander's Georgia Tech Yellow Jackets football teams, younger than Red Barron and older than Pat Barron.  Carter was selected an All-Southern halfback in 1926. A knee injury ultimately ended his football career. Carter also played on the baseball, basketball, and lacrosse teams.

Motion picture executive
In 1942, he was named Washington representative of Metro-Goldwyn-Mayer studios.

Amphitheatre
The Carter Barron Amphitheatre is located in Rock Creek Park of Washington, D. C. The plan was expanded upon by Barron as Vice-Chairman for the Sesquicentennial Commission in 1947 as a way to memorialize the 150th Anniversary of Washington, D. C. as the nation's capital.

Personal life

Politically a Democrat, Barron was a personal friend of presidents Harry Truman and Franklin D. Roosevelt.

Two of Carter Barron's nieces, Jo Barron Atchison and Alae Risse Lietch, began attending Georgia Tech games when they were young in the 1930s because of tickets sent by Carter Barron. Atchison and Lietch in 2017, were featured in an article in the Atlanta Journal Constitution about their long standing attendance to Tech Football games started by Carter Barron.

See also
1926 College Football All-Southern Team

References

External links 

 

1905 births
1950 deaths
American football halfbacks
All-Southern college football players
People from Clarkesville, Georgia
Players of American football from Georgia (U.S. state)
Georgia Tech Yellow Jackets football players
Baseball players from Georgia (U.S. state)
Georgia Tech Yellow Jackets baseball players
Georgia Tech Yellow Jackets men's basketball players
Washington, D.C., Democrats
People from Washington, D.C.
American men's basketball players